Fulya Hakkı Yeten Football Facility is a football stadium of the Beşiktaş J.K. sports club at Fulya neighborhood of Şişli district in Istanbul, Turkey.

The facility was named to honor Hakkı Yeten (1910–1989), former footballer, coach and president of Beşiktaş J.K. The facility was built in 1990. It has a covered area of  It is capable of hosting 40 sportspeople.

The venue is home to football matches of the club's feeder teams. With effect of the 2019-20 Turkish Women's First Football League, the stadium hosts the matches of the Beşiktaş J.K. women's football team.

The stadium has an artificial turf ground. One covered grandstand's capacity is 300 spectators. It has floodlight installed.

References

Sports venues in Istanbul
Football venues in Turkey
Sports venues completed in 1990
1990 establishments in Turkey
Beşiktaş J.K. facilities
Sport in Şişli